Anushka Sharma (born 1 May 1988) is an Indian actress and former producer who works in Hindi films. She has received several awards, including a Filmfare Award. One of the highest-paid actresses in India as of 2018, she has appeared in Forbes Indias Celebrity 100 since 2012 and was featured by Forbes Asia in their 30 Under 30 list of 2018.

Born in Ayodhya and raised in Bangalore, Sharma had her first modelling assignment for the fashion designer Wendell Rodricks in 2007 and later moved to Mumbai to pursue a full-time career as a model. She made her acting debut opposite Shah Rukh Khan in the top-grossing romantic film Rab Ne Bana Di Jodi (2008) and rose to prominence with starring roles in Yash Raj Films' romances Band Baaja Baaraat (2010) and Jab Tak Hai Jaan (2012); winning the Filmfare Award for Best Supporting Actress for the latter. Sharma went on to earn praise for playing strong-willed women in the crime thriller NH10 (2015), and the dramas Dil Dhadakne Do (2015), Ae Dil Hai Mushkil (2016), and Sui Dhaaga (2018). Her highest-grossing releases came with the sports drama Sultan (2016), and Rajkumar Hirani's films PK (2014) and Sanju (2018). This was followed by a hiatus from acting.

Sharma was the co-founder of the production company Clean Slate Filmz, under which she produced several films and web series, including NH10 and Paatal Lok (2020). She is the ambassador for multiple brands and products, has designed her own line of clothing for women, named Nush, and supports various charities and causes, including gender equality and animal rights. Sharma is married to the cricketer Virat Kohli, with whom she has a daughter.

Early life and modelling career 
Anushka Sharma was born on 1 May 1988 in Ayodhya, Uttar Pradesh. Her father, Colonel Ajay Kumar Sharma, is an army officer, and her mother, Ashima Sharma, is a homemaker. Her ancestral home is in Dehradun town of Uttarakhand on Naishvilla road, her father lived here before joining Indian army. Anushka Sharma's grandmother Urmila still lives in their house. Sharma lived in Sheela Bhawan of Naishvilla road in her childhood.

Her father is a native of Uttar Pradesh, while her mother is a Garhwali. Her elder brother is film producer Karnesh Sharma, who earlier served in the Merchant Navy. Sharma has stated that being a military brat played an important role in shaping her as a person and contributing to her life. In an interview with The Times of India in 2012, she said, "I take pride in saying that I am an army officer's daughter even more than being an actor."

Sharma was raised in Bangalore. But she did her primary schooling at St. Mary's School, Margherita, Assam. Sakshi Dhoni, the wife of M.S Dhoni, was her classmate in that school. She completed her schooling at Army School, Bangalore. Then she did her graduation in arts from Mount Carmel College, Bangalore.

She originally intended to pursue a career in modelling or journalism, and had no aspirations to be an actress. After graduation, Sharma moved to Mumbai to further her modelling career. She enrolled herself at the Elite Model Management, and was groomed by the style consultant Prasad Bidapa. In 2007, Sharma made her runway debut at the Lakme Fashion Week for designer Wendell Rodricks's Les Vamps Show and was picked to be his finale model at the Spring Summer 2007 Collection. Since then she has done campaigns for the brands Silk & Shine, Whisper, Nathella Jewelry and Fiat Palio. Sharma later said, "I think I was born to emote and act. I would walk down the ramp and smile and they used to say, 'give us a blank look.' It was really difficult, not to smile". Whilst modelling, Sharma also joined an acting school and began auditioning for film roles.

Acting career

Breakthrough (2008–2013) 
Sharma made her acting debut in Aditya Chopra's romantic drama Rab Ne Bana Di Jodi (2008), opposite Shah Rukh Khan. She took a day to prepare for her screen test at the Yash Raj Films studio and refused to do an impromptu one. She was signed for a three-film deal with the company and landed the leading role of Tani Sahni, a young bride to a middle-aged man, portrayed by Khan. Khalid Mohamed of Hindustan Times found her to be "assured and upright" in the film, but Nikhat Kazmi thought that she "lacks all chutzpah and can barely hold your attention". The film was a major commercial success, emerging as the second-highest grossing Hindi film of that year, and earned Sharma Filmfare Award nominations for Best Actress and Best Female Debut. Two years later, Sharma played the leading lady in the crime-comedy Badmaash Company, directed by Parmeet Sethi and co-starring Shahid Kapoor, Vir Das and Meiyang Chang. The film, which tells the story of four underachieving friends who begin a scam business enterprise, received mixed reviews.

Later in 2010, Sharma completed her three-film contract with Yash Raj Films by starring in Band Baaja Baaraat, a romantic comedy directed by Maneesh Sharma and co-starring debutant Ranveer Singh. Her role was that of Shruti Kakkar, an ambitious middle-class Punjabi girl who starts her own wedding planning business. In preparation for the part, Sharma learned to speak in the Punjabi dialect, which she cited as the toughest part of her role; she described the way the lead characters in the film interact as "crude but cute" and it required her to "talk fast, sometimes mix words and even omit words completely". Trade analysts expressed doubt on Band Baaja Baaraats financial prospect, citing the middling response to Yash Raj Films' last few productions, the lack of a male star, and saying that by then Sharma was an "almost-forgotten" actress. However, Band Baaja Baaraat earned positive reviews and emerged as a sleeper hit. Sharma's performance was praised by critics, many of whom cited it as her best work to that point. The critic Anupama Chopra wrote that Sharma "comes into her own as the ambitious Delhi girl, who dreams of upgrading to multi-crore Sainik Farms weddings". For her work in the film, Sharma received her second nomination for the Filmfare Award for Best Actress.

Sharma's first venture not to be produced by Yash Raj Films was the drama Patiala House (2011) directed by Nikkhil Advani and co-starring Akshay Kumar. The film tells the story of a budding cricketer (played by Kumar) who encounters trouble in convincing his father of his profession; Sharma was cast as the love interest of Kumar's character. Sukanya Verma of Rediff.com praised Sharma's work and labelled her a "metaphor for energy". That same year, she re-united with co-star Ranveer Singh and director Maneesh Sharma for the comedy-drama Ladies vs Ricky Bahl. She featured as Ishika Desai, a salesgirl hired to outwit a conman (essayed by Singh), who ends up falling in love with him instead. The film and Sharma's performance received mixed reviews, with Piyali Dasgupta of NDTV calling her "believable but not endearing". Despite mixed reviews, the film was a moderate success at the box office. 

In 2012, Sharma played a supporting role alongside Shah Rukh Khan and Katrina Kaif in Yash Chopra's "swan song", the romance Jab Tak Hai Jaan, which marked her fifth collaboration with Yash Raj Films and her second with Khan. She was cast as Akira Rai, a Discovery Channel reporter who harbours ambitions of being a documentary filmmaker. Rajeev Masand wrote that Sharma "brings a spark to the film", but Raja Sen disagreed and said that "while Anushka can indeed play spunky, she needed here to tone it down several notches". For her role, she won the Filmfare Award for Best Supporting Actress. Jab Tak Hai Jaan proved to be the third highest-grossing Bollywood film of 2012.

Sharma next appeared in Vishal Bhardwaj's Matru Ki Bijlee Ka Mandola (2013), a political satire set in a village in Haryana. Co-starring alongside Pankaj Kapur, Imran Khan and Shabana Azmi, Sharma played the titular role of Bijlee Mandola, a strong-headed girl who engages in a romantic affair with Khan's character despite being engaged to another man. The film received positive to mixed reviews from critics, and underperformed at the box office. Several critics noted that Sharma was being stereotyped as a loud and loquacious girl; Raja Sen noted that she "is great in a couple of scenes near the climax," though Kanika Sikka of Daily News and Analysis was more critical and found her "unconvincing".

Established actress and expansion into film production (2014–2016) 
In 2014, Sharma played a television journalist who befriends an alien (played by Aamir Khan), in Rajkumar Hirani's religious satire PK. Critic Saibal Chatterjee wrote that Sharma plays "a feisty poetry-loving girl who knows her mind far more than most Hindi film heroines are allowed to" and praised her for "hold[ing] her own" against Khan. Sharma launched a production company named Clean Slate Filmz, whose first release was Navdeep Singh's thriller NH10 (2015), in which she also played the lead role. Screened at the 5th Beijing International Film Festival, it tells the story of a married couple whose lives are endangered after an encounter with a group of criminals. In preparation, Sharma underwent interval training for three months to build her stamina. Saibal Chatterjee found the film to be a "taut and riveting thriller" and praised Sharma for "conveying a range of moods as she moves from the vulnerable to the fearless in a battle in which the odds are stacked heavily against her", and Prarthana Sarkar of International Business Times credited her for breaking away from her romantic comedy image. The film also emerged as a box office success.

In Anurag Kashyap's period crime drama Bombay Velvet (2015), (based on the historian Gyan Prakash's book Mumbai Fables) co-starring Ranbir Kapoor and Karan Johar, Sharma was cast as a jazz singer, Rosie Noronha. Her character was referenced from the actresses Brigitte Bardot, Helen and Waheeda Rehman. To prepare, Sharma watched films of the 1950s and 1960s, and documentaries about hair and make-up. She also used temporary lip enhancers for the part, citing it as the reason behind her changed appearance on a chat show in 2014, and refuted media speculation about having undergone plastic surgery. Bombay Velvet was screened at the Locarno and Bucheon film festivals; critical opinion was mixed. Writing for Business Standard, Ritika Bhatia praised Sharma's performance in the song "Dhadaam Dhadaam": "she fills the stage with such raw emotion that her mascara-laden tears and fake eyelashes flutter with arresting passion". However, the film failed to recoup its  investment. In the same year, Sharma featured in the supporting role of a dancer aboard a cruise ship in Zoya Akhtar's Dil Dhadakne Do, an ensemble comedy-drama in which she was featured opposite Ranveer Singh. The song sequence "Pehli Baar" was choreographed by her and Singh; Shilpa Jamkhandikar of Reuters praised their on-screen chemistry and described it as "crackling". Her performances in NH10 and Dil Dhadakne Do earned Sharma Filmfare Award nominations for Best Actress and Best Supporting Actress, respectively.

Sharma next reunited with Yash Raj Films in Sultan (2016), a romantic sports drama from the writer-director Ali Abbas Zafar. She took on the role of Aarfa Hussain, a wrestler from Haryana who inspires the title character (played by Salman Khan) to take up the sport. Sharma was initially hesitant to play the part as she did not have the physique of a wrestler; she researched on different weight categories to "beat people's perception that all wrestlers are huge." She trained for six weeks in the sport, learned to speak the Haryanvi dialect, and interacted with female wrestlers from the state. The film and her performance received mixed reviews. Critics were appreciative of her substantial role in an androcentric film; Filmfares Rachit Gupta described Sharma as "the best thing in the film" and noted that "[e]ven though she doesn't have the physique of a wrestler, her spirited performance makes you believe in her tough but emotional character." However, Suprateek Chatterjee of The Huffington Post felt that she was unconvincing as a wrestler, writing that "she possesses literally zero muscles and somehow always finds the time to get her make-up just right." With earnings of over  worldwide, Sultan ranks among Indian cinema's biggest grossers.

Sharma achieved further success later that year when she played the lead female role of Alizeh Khan, a free-spirited girl in a loveless relationship in Karan Johar's romantic drama Ae Dil Hai Mushkil, alongside Ranbir Kapoor and Aishwarya Rai. Mike Maccahil of The Guardian took note of how much Sharma "terrific spikiness" and her chemistry with Kapoor helped a mediocre picture. In another typical mixed review, Sweta Kaushal of Hindustan Times praised Sharma's empowered female lead. The film earned over  worldwide, and Sharma received a Best Actress nomination at the 62nd Filmfare Awards. With two top-grossing films in 2016, Bollywood Hungama ranked Sharma as the most successful Bollywood actress of the year.

Career fluctuations, production focus, and hiatus (2017–present) 

The 2017 fantasy comedy Phillauri, co-starring Suraj Sharma and Diljit Dosanjh, featured Sharma as a friendly ghost who wants to reunite with her lover. In addition to acting and producing, Sharma also sang a song in it. She next collaborated with Shah Rukh Khan for the third time in Imtiaz Ali's Jab Harry Met Sejal, a romance about a Gujrati tourist (Sharma) in Europe who falls in love with her tour guide. Commenting on Sharma's performances in Phillauri and Jab Harry Met Sejal, Uday Bhatia of Mint praised her ability for "straight-faced com[edy]". Bhatia, however, criticised her pairing with Khan, 22 years her senior, in the latter film. Unlike her 2016 releases, both these films were box office flops.

Sharma's first film release of 2018 was the horror film Pari, which she starred in and produced. It tells the story of Rukhsana (Sharma), a battered young woman living in the wilderness, who is rescued by a benevolent man (played by Parambrata Chatterjee). Though Shubhra Gupta of The Indian Express found the film "scatter-brained" and added that "nothing can rescue it, not even a leading lady who is determined to do something different with her producing heft", Sukanya Verma featured her performance in Rediff.com's annual list of best actresses, writing, "going from unhinged to ghastly to mesmeric, here's an actress who's game for everything." Sharma next played a biographer documenting the life of the troubled actor Sanjay Dutt in Rajkumar Hirani's biopic Sanju, starring Ranbir Kapoor in the title role. Rajeev Masand commended the film's ensemble but was critical of Sharma's performance, writing that she "sticks out with strange hair and stranger accent". Even so, it emerged as her third release to earn over  worldwide.

In the same year, Sharma teamed with Yash Raj Films for the eighth time in Sui Dhaaga, a comedy-drama co-starring Varun Dhawan, about a poor, young couple who begin their own small-scale clothing industry. Ronak Kotecha of The Times of India praised the subtle chemistry between the leads and credited Sharma for playing the restrained role effortlessly. She received a nomination for the Filmfare Critics Award for Best Actress. Sharma's final film appearance of the year was in Zero, a drama about a dwarf's romantic tribulations involving two women, which reunited her with Shah Rukh Khan and Katrina Kaif. She played a NASA scientist with cerebral palsy, for which she met with an occupational therapist and an audiologist; she also stayed in character and chose to use a wheelchair between shots. Anupama Chopra considered her portrayal of the condition to be "inconsistent and clumsy" but Namrata Joshi of The Hindu found her "earnest and invested". As with her previous collaboration with Khan, Zero was a commercial failure.

In 2020, Sharma served as executive producer for her company's crime thriller series Paatal Lok, which was released on Amazon Prime Video, and produced the horror film Bulbbul for Netflix. Anna M. M. Vetticad found recurring themes of "feminism and the paranormal" in several of her company's projects, and credited Sharma for her "courageous, non-conformist" choices as a producer. In 2022, Sharma announced that she would step away from her producing duties for her banner Clean Slate Filmz, and that her brother would be the sole owner of the company.

Sharma will return to acting after four years with a biopic of cricketer Jhulan Goswami, named Chakda 'Xpress, which will release on Netflix.

Personal life and off-screen work 

Sharma started practicing vegetarianism in 2015. The Times of India has listed her as one of "Bollywood's hottest vegetarian celebrities". She has also been named as "The Person of the Year" by the People for the Ethical Treatment of Animals (PETA) on multiple occasions.  She is an avid practitioner of Transcendental Meditation. Sharma has confessed to being a victim of anxiety disorder and seeking treatment for it.

A practicing Hindu, Sharma, along with her family, is a follower of Anant Dham Atmabodh Ashram in Haridwar. The ashram is headed by Maharaj Anant Baba, who is her family's spiritual guru and the actress is a regular visitor to the ashram. Sharma's romantic relationship with the cricketer Virat Kohli has attracted substantial media coverage in India, though she has been reluctant to publicly talk about it. The couple married in Italy on 11 December 2017. On 11 January 2021, Sharma gave birth to a girl, Vamika.

On June 14 2022, Anushka Shama publicly criticized the Times Group for sharing a photo of her daughter taken on vacation without her permission. Anushka is extremely private about her personal life and has repeatedly requested the media and paparazzi to not share pictures of her daughter.

In September 2013, Sharma participated and walked the ramp in a fashion show that was held in memory of the late filmmaker, Yash Chopra. She participated in the opening ceremony of the 2015 Indian Premier League held at Kolkata, along with other celebrities including Hrithik Roshan, Shahid Kapoor, Saif Ali Khan, Farhan Akhtar and composer Pritam.

Apart from acting, Sharma supports a number of charities and causes. She walked the ramp to support Shabana Azmi's Mijwan Welfare Society, a Non-governmental organization that helps empower women. In 2013, alongside other Bollywood actors, she pledged to support the education of India's young girls as part of NDTV's "Our Girls, Our Pride" fundraiser. That same year, she appeared alongside other celebrities in a commercial, produced by the National Film Development Corporation of India, to create awareness about the 'Right to Education' for children. In December 2014, Sharma auctioned the leather jacket she wore in Jab Tak Hai Jaan on eBay, with proceeds going to the redevelopment of the flood-ravaged states of Kashmir and Assam. Sharma had also fronted a campaign to collect donations for the victims of the April 2015 Nepal earthquake. She supports the annual Mumbai Film Festival, and donated money in its cause in 2015. Sharma has been vocal about the disparity in the pay that actresses command, in comparison with their male counterparts in the film industry. In 2016, she supported India's first transgender band, the 6-Pack Band (initiated by Y-Films), by providing a voice over in their first single, "Hum Hain Happy."

Sharma has also spoken up for animal rights on social media. In April 2014, she took to Twitter to ask for a ban on horse-drawn carriages in Mumbai. In June 2015, she condemned the Yulin Dog Meat Festival in China, and urged her fans to sign an online petition aimed at stopping it. In October 2015, she launched 'Pawsitivity', a campaign aimed at sensitising people about the adverse effects of noise, air, water and soil pollution on animals. In October 2017, Sharma launched her own clothing line, named Nush.

Media image 

Priya Gupta of The Times of India has said that "the best part of [Sharma's] stardom is that she does not have the trappings of a star." Kalpana Nair of Firstpost stated: "actresses like Sharma command the respect they do in a largely conservative and male-dominated industry and the fact that their fan base grows when they take on roles that are not conventional is good reason for us to beam widely and walk with a spring in our step". Samar Srivastava, writing for Forbes, called her "unafraid", and added: "you would be hard-pressed to associate Sharma with the stereotype of a mainstream leading lady." The Times of India published that "..she never shies away from putting [her opinion] across."

Sharma featured on Rediff.com's list of "Bollywood's Best Actors" for Band Baaja Baaraat (2010), and NH10 (2015). She was also featured in their list of "Bollywood's Best Dressed Actresses" in 2012–13. She held the fifth position on The Times of India's listing of the "Most Desirable Woman" in 2011. Since 2012, she has appeared in Forbes Indias Celebrity 100, a list based on the income and popularity of Indian celebrities. Sharma maintains a Twitter account and has an official Facebook page. She is cited as one of the most popular Indian celebrities on social media. In 2015, she appeared on The Huffington Posts list of "100 most influential women on Twitter". The same year, she also topped the Times Celebex list of Bollywood stars, in terms of highest box-office collection. In 2016, she featured on The Times of Indias 'Most Engaging on Twitter' list of Hindi film actors. Filmfare magazine's fashion poll of 2015 voted her as being "Amazing with Androgyny" and said that "...[she] has carved a niche for her easy breezy high street style." She also featured on Verve magazine's "Best Dressed 2015" list. In 2018, Sharma appeared in the Forbes Asias 30 Under 30 list, and Fortune India's "50 Most Powerful Women in Business".
In 2019, she featured on Fortune India's "50 Most Powerful Women in Business" list again. Sharma is a celebrity endorser for various brands and products, including TVS Scooty, Nivea, Elle 18 cosmetics, Bru coffee and Pantene.

Filmography

Films

Web series

Music video

References

Further reading

External links 
 
 
 
 

1988 births
21st-century Indian actresses
Actresses in Hindi cinema
Bangalore University alumni
Female models from Uttar Pradesh
Indian film actresses
Indian Hindus
Living people
Garhwali people
Actresses from Bangalore
Actresses from Mumbai
People from Ayodhya
Actresses from Uttar Pradesh
Mount Carmel College, Bangalore alumni
Filmfare Awards winners
International Indian Film Academy Awards winners
Zee Cine Awards winners